Springfield Lake is a small lake located in Middle Sackville, Halifax Regional Municipality. The shoreline perimeter is 5.6 km, the mean depth is 3 m and the maximum depth is 5 m (Mandaville 2000). Springfield is a headwater lake that is fed solely by underground springs and runoff. Located in the Shubenacadie watershed, it ultimately feeds into the Bay of Fundy. It lies in pyretic slate bedrock that is high in hydrogen and sulphur (Kerekes et al. 1986). The shoreline is fully developed (lined by private homes and cottages) with over 530 houses in the 500 ha watershed. Homes on streets adjacent to the lake receive municipal sewage treatment. There is a HRM Water Pollution Control Plant (secondary sludge activation), constructed in 1987, that discharges effluent into a stream outflowing at the north end of the lake. There is a public beach at the northwestern end of the Lake.

Details
Average width: 
Basin permanence index: 
Approximate flushing rate: 2.1 volumes per year
Relative depth: 0.43%
Shoreline development index: 1.70
Volume development index: 2.1
In-lake total phosphorus retention index: 0.7

References
 Mandaville, S. 2000. Limnology in Nova Scotia: lake data and predictive phosphorus models: archives in electronic format. 1st Edition [Halifax, N.S.]. Soil & Water Conservation Society of Metro at. 1st Edition [Halifax, N.S.]. Soil & Water Conservation Society of Metro Halifax, 2000. Description xii, 74, d p.: ill.; 28 cm. + 1 computer laser optical disk (4 in.). Notes "May, 2000", Project F-2, Includes bibliographical references.
 Kerekes, J., Beauchamp, S, Tordon, R., and T. Pollock. 1986. Sources of sulphate and acidity in wetlands and lakes in Nova Scotia. 1986. Water, Air, and Soil Poll. 31: 207–214.

External links
Springfield Lake Watch
Springfield Lake study report

Lakes of Nova Scotia
Landforms of Halifax, Nova Scotia
Landforms of Halifax County, Nova Scotia